is a Fukui Railway Fukubu Line railway station located in the city of Fukui, Fukui Prefecture, Japan.

Lines

Station layout
The station consists of one ground-level side platform serving a single bi-directional track. The station is unattended.

Adjacent stations

History
The station opened on September 20, 1997. In 2000 the station design recognized by the Ministry of Land, Infrastructure and Transport's Chubu District Transport Bureau

Surrounding area
The station is between two major roads linking Fukui and Echizen (National Route 8 and Prefectural Route 229).
The main point of interest is Harmony Hall Fukui, a music hall operated by the prefectural government.

See also
 List of railway stations in Japan

External links

  

Railway stations in Fukui Prefecture
Railway stations in Japan opened in 1997
Fukui Railway Fukubu Line
Fukui (city)